Mendizabalia is a genus of beetles in the family Buprestidae, containing the following species:

 Mendizabalia germaini (Germain & Kerremans, 1906)
 Mendizabalia penai Bellamy & Moore, 1991

References

Buprestidae genera